Koroshi(Balochi: کوروٚشی), is a Balochi dialect. The speakers of Koroshi live in scattered pockets in Southern Iranian Fars province.  The number of speakers was estimated to be 1000 in 2006. According to Ethnologue the dialect has 180 speakers within 40 to 50 families.
Entirely isolated from the main body of the Baloch habitat, Koroshi distinguishes itself in grammar and lexicon among Balochi varieties.

Phonology
The transcription used here is only an approximation:

Vowels
short: â, a, e, i, o, u
long: â:, ā, ē, ī, ō, ū

Consonants
voiced dental fricative: ð, like in 'sað' (hundred).
voiced velar fricative: ɣ, like in 'maɣz' (copula).
alveolar trill: like in 'arra' (saw, the hand tool).
palatal: 'g' and 'k', like in 'heykal' (body) and 'merzeng' (eyelash).

Grammar

Verbs
Infinitive markers: -ag ('g' is palatal here).

Nouns
The suffixes "-yok" and "-â" make nouns definite. Examples:
golâbi (pear) → golâbi-yok (the pear)
bâmard (man) → bâmard-â (the man)

The indefinite marker is "i". Example:
čok (child) → čokk-i (a child)

The plural is marked by the suffixes "-gal" and "obâr" . Examples:
mardin (man) → mardin-gal (men)
sib (apple) → sib-obâr (apples)

Adjectives are placed before nouns. Examples:
siyâhayn angur (black grape)
qašanguveyn pirâhâm (beautiful shirt)

Vocabulary

Example sentences

See also
 Dialects of Fars
 Northwestern Iranian languages
 Iranian languages

References

Fars Province
Languages of Iran
Northwestern Iranian languages
Endangered Iranian languages